Mohammad Saeed Khan (1 January 1937 – 24 May 2005), better known as Rangeela, was a Pakistani Lollywood actor, singer and director. 

He is regarded as one of the finest comedians of the Pakistani film industry. 

Beginning in 1958 with the Punjabi film Jatti, he eventually performed in over 300 films in his career spanning over 4 decades.

Early life and career
His birth name was Mohammad Saeed Khan and he was born in Parachinar, a city in the Kurram District of Khyber Pakhtunkhwa. His family moved to Peshawar when he was very young. He took a keen interest in bodybuilding and physical exercises as a teenager. He moved to Lahore at a young age and earned his livelihood by painting billboards for the Pakistani film industry. Once, when the shooting of a film was taking place, an actor for the film's jolly character role was needed. The film director asked Mohammad Saeed Khan to play the part which he did. All those present during the shooting were amused by his acting style and he became an actor through sheer luck. Rangeela made his professional cinematic debut in a 1958 Punjabi film Jatti, directed by M. J. Rana. 

He started playing humorous roles in movies and, to everybody's surprise, became highly popular. In 1969, he formed 'Rangeela Productions' to produce his own movies. He not only produced films but also directed his productions, sang songs, and wrote some scripts as well. His movies, to the surprise of many film industry stalwarts, attracted a large number of viewers. The film Diya Aur Toofan, released on 9 May 1969, was Rangeela's directional debut. He directed numerous movies under the banner of Rangeela Productions. His acting was showcased in the film Rangeela (1970), in which he played the title role. His third consecutive hit film was Dil Aur Dunya (1971), starring Habib, Aasia and Rangeela. He brought to the film Dil Aur Dunya, a sobering sense of a director's prowess which is the opposite to his celluloid persona.

When Rangeela produced film Dia Aur Toofan, he sang a song Gaa mere manwa gata ja re, janaa hai hamka duur under the music direction of Kamal Ahmed. People of the film industry were taken aback to know Rangeela was producing a film. The film attracted a large number of movie-goers. His song also became very popular.

Family
He was married three times and had eight daughters and six sons, with a daughter Farah Deeba who's a politician in Lahore, another daughter is a CPA accountant based in America while his sons Kamran and Jahanzaib acted in some movies.

Death
Rangeela died of a cardiac arrest on 24 May 2005 at the age of 68.

Awards
Nigar Award for best screenwriter, for film Rangeela in 1970
Nigar Award for best comedian, in the film Dil Aur Dunya in 1971
Nigar Award for best comedian, in the film Insaan Aur Gadha in 1973
Special award from Nigar Awards for simultaneously playing three roles in the film Meri Zindigi Hai Naghma in 1972
Special award from Nigar Awards for his comic role in the film Naukar tay Maalik in 1982
Nigar Award for best story- writer, in the film Sona chandi in 1983
Nigar Award for best director in the film Sona Chandi in 1983
Nigar Award for best comedian in the film Miss Colombo in 1984
Nigar Award for best comedian in the film Baghi Qaidi in 1986
Nigar Award for best comedian in the film Teen yakkay teen chakkay in 1991
Nigar Award Special Awards, Millennium Award in 1999
Pride of Performance Award in 2005 by the President of Pakistan for his contributions to the Pakistan film industry

Filmography

As a Director
Amanat (1981)
Aurat Raj (1979)
Kubra Ashiq (1973)
Dil Aur Duniya (1971)
Rangeela (1970)
Diya Aur Toofan (1969)
Meri Mohabbat Teray Hawalay
Ickey ickey wacha
Subha Ka Tara
Ganwaar
Jahaiz
Namak Halal
Kaka Jee
Raja Rani
Sahab Bahadur
Quli

Producer
Aurat Raj (1979)
Kubra Ashiq (1973)
Dil Aur Duniya (1971)
Rangeela (1970)
Diya Aur Toofan (1969)

Playback songs
 1969 (Film: Dia Aur Toofan - Urdu) ... Ga Meray Manwa, Gata Ja Ray, Jana Hay Ham Ka Door, Music: Kamal Ahmed, Poet: Rangeela
 1971 (Film: Dil Aur Dunya - Urdu) ... Bata A Dunya Walay, Yeh Kaisi Teri Basti Hay, Music: Kemal Ahmad, Poet: Kaleem Usmani
 1971 (Film: Dil Aur Dunya - Urdu) ... Lay Chal Ray Chhailva, Sajania Kay Gaun Mein, Music: Kemal Ahmad, Poet: Kemal Ahmad
 1972 (Film: Main Bhi To Insaan Hon - Urdu) ... Mera Mehboob Meray Pyar Ka Qatil Nikla, Music: M. Ashraf, Poet: Shabab Kiranwi

Screenwriter
Rangeela (1970)
Aurat Raj (1979)

See also 
 Music of Pakistan
 List of Lollywood actors

References

External links 
 

1937 births
2005 deaths
Nigar Award winners
Recipients of the Pride of Performance
Pakistani male comedians
Pakistani male film actors
Pakistani film producers
Pakistani playback singers
Pashtun people
Film directors from Lahore
20th-century Pakistani male singers
20th-century comedians
People from Kurram District
People from Lahore